Sean W. Rowe (born February 16, 1975) is the eighth and current Episcopal Bishop of the Episcopal Diocese of Northwestern Pennsylvania. He is also bishop provisional of the Diocese of Western New York.

Education and early career
Rowe graduated from Grove City College and Virginia Theological Seminary. He was, at age 24, the youngest Episcopal priest in the United States at the time of his ordination, in December 2000. He was rector of St. John's Episcopal Church in Franklin, Pennsylvania, in the Diocese of Northwestern PA.

Election and consecration

At the time of his election, Rowe was 32 years old, and would become the youngest member of the House of Bishops. Rowe was elected on the first ballot from a slate of four candidates, with 64 lay votes and 29 clergy votes. The election was at the Cathedral of Saint Paul in Erie, Pennsylvania on May 19, 2007. In October 2009, Rowe was granted an honorary doctorate in divinity from the Virginia Theological Seminary. Rowe received an appointment to the Theology faculty at Gannon University, Pennsylvania, in 2008.

Rowe was consecrated on September 8, 2007. The consecrators included Presiding Bishop Katharine Jefferts Schori, Rowe's predecessor Bishop Robert D. Rowley, retired Bishop Mark Dyer of the Diocese of Bethlehem, Ralph E. Jones, bishop of the Northwestern Pennsylvania Synod of the Evangelical Lutheran Church in America (ELCA), Arthur Williams, retired Bishop suffragan of the Diocese of Ohio, and Wayne P. Wright, bishop of Delaware.

In October 2009, Rowe was given a commission as a Kentucky Colonel by the Governor of the Commonwealth of Kentucky after being nominated by several clergy of his diocese. The mission of the Honorable Order of the Kentucky Colonels is "irrevocably dedicated to and is organized and operated exclusively for charitable purposes."  Funds from the Honorable Order of Kentucky Colonels have been utilized for the purchase of wheelchairs for muscular dystrophy victims, for the distribution of books to school children.

In March, 2014, Rowe was elected as the Provisional Bishop of the Diocese of Bethlehem in the eastern part of the state. An election for bishop requires a two-thirds majority: Rowe earned 64 of 64 clergy votes and 99 of 100 layperson votes. Upon his election, Rowe spoke briefly to the clergy and laypersons who were present and said, "Today you did not elect the smartest or the most spiritual bishop ever. The fact is, there are people here who have been praying twice as long as I’ve been alive. What you’ll get is one who is faithful to God, at least most of the time, and one who stands firmly on the promises of Jesus Christ." He finished by adding, "I am your servant."

Rowe remains the bishop of the Diocese of Northwestern Pennsylvania after receiving permission from church officials to serve the needs of both dioceses; as provisional bishop, Rowe will serve the congregants of the Diocese of Bethlehem for three years. The Diocese of Bethlehem is decidedly larger than that of Erie, with 63 congregations, 15,000 congregants, and covering 14 counties. The Diocese of Erie reports having 33 congregations, 5,000 congregants, and serves 13 counties. In addition to becoming the Provisional Bishop of Bethlehem, he also completed his PhD at Gannon University in Organizational Leadership.

Rowe attended the annual House of Bishops meeting, which was held in Taipei, Taiwan, in September 2014. According to the Episcopal News Service (ENS), the theme of this year's meeting was "Expanding Apostolic Imagination". Along with representatives from the Anglican Church in Hong Kong, Japan, Pakistan, the Philippines, and Korea, Rowe considered the theological context and mission challenges their provinces face.

See also

 List of Episcopal bishops of the United States
 Historical list of the Episcopal bishops of the United States

References

External links
 Official web site of the Diocese of Northwestern Pennsylvania

1975 births
Living people
People from Erie, Pennsylvania
Grove City College alumni
Virginia Theological Seminary alumni
Episcopal bishops of Northwestern Pennsylvania
Episcopal bishops of Bethlehem
Episcopal bishops of Western New York